Mycolicibacterium austroafricanum is a species of the phylum Actinomycetota (Gram-positive bacteria with high guanine and cytosine content, one of the dominant phyla of all bacteria), belonging to the genus Mycolicibacterium.

References

TSUKAMURA (M.), VAN DER MEULEN (H.J.) and GRABOW (W.O.K.): Numerical taxonomy of rapidly growing, scotochromogenic mycobacteria of the Mycobacterium parafortuitum complex: Mycobacterium austroafricanum sp. nov. and Mycobacterium diernhoferi sp. nov., nom. rev. Int. J. Syst. Bacteriol., 1983, 33, 460–469.

External links
Type strain of Mycobacterium austroafricanum at BacDive -  the Bacterial Diversity Metadatabase

Acid-fast bacilli
austroafricanum
Bacteria described in 1983